Paul Dennis Étienne (born June 15, 1959) is an American prelate of the Roman Catholic Church who has been serving as archbishop of the Archdiocese of Seattle in Washington State since 2019.

Previously, Etienne was bishop of the Diocese of Cheyenne in Wyoming from 2009 to 2016 and archbishop of the Archdiocese of Anchorage in Alaska from 2016 to 2019. On September 3, 2019, Etienne automatically became the sixth archbishop of Seattle following the resignation of his predecessor.

Early life and education 
Paul Etienne was born June 15, 1959, in Tell City, Indiana, the second son of Paul and Kay Etienne.  One of his uncles is a diocesan priest and an aunt is a Benedictine nun. Etienne has a sister (Nicolette) who is a Benedictine nun at Our Lady of Grace Monastery in Beech Grove, Indiana; two brothers, (Zachary and Bernard) are diocesan priests in the Diocese of Evansville.

In 1983, Paul Etienne entered Bellarmine University in Louisville, Kentucky, but in 1984 transferred to University of St. Thomas in St. Paul, Minnesota. He obtained a Bachelor of Business Administration degree from St. Thomas in 1986.  After his graduation, Etienne worked for a year for the United States Conference of Catholic Bishops (USCCB) as an assistant coordinator for papal visits.

In 1988, Etienne travelled to Rome to attend the Pontifical North American College.  He obtained at Bachelor of Sacred Theology degree from the Pontifical Gregorian University in 1992.

Ordination and ministry 
Etienne was ordained a priest by Bishop Gerald Gettelfinger for the Archdiocese of Indianapolis on June 27, 1992. After his ordination, Etienne served as assistant pastor of Saint Barnabas Parish in Indianapolis and assistant vocation director for the archdiocese.  He returned to Rome in 1994, obtaining his Licentiate of Spiritual Theology from Gregorian University in 1995.

On his return to Indiana, Etienne was appointed director of vocations for the archdiocese (1995–1998) and pastor of the Our Lady of Perpetual Help Parish in New Albany, Indiana  Beginning in 2002, Etienne started serving at Saint John the Baptist Parish in New Albany, and as pastor of the Saint Simon the Apostle Parish and Saint John the Evangelist Parish in Indianapolis (2008–2009).  In 2008, Etienne was also appointed as vice-rector of Bishop Simon Bruté College Seminary in Indianapolis and then pastor in 2009 of Saint Paul Parish at Tell City. He was also consultant and member of the archdiocesan council of priests.

Bishop of Cheyenne

On October 19, 2009, Pope Benedict XVI appointed Etienne as bishop of the Diocese of Cheyenne . He succeeded Bishop David L. Ricken.  Etienne was consecrated by Archbishop Charles J. Chaput on December 9, 2009.

In 2010, Etienne requested an investigation by the Vatican into sexual abuse allegations by 11 men against Joseph Hart, a former bishop of Wyoming.  Etienne suspended Hart from performing masses in 2015.

Archbishop of Anchorage

Pope Francis appointed Etienne as archbishop of the Archdiocese of Anchorage on October 4, 2016. He was installed at Our Lady of Guadalupe Co-Cathedral in Anchorage on November 9, 2016. He succeeded Archbishop Roger Schwietz. In October 2018, Etienne said that he would establish an independent commission to examine the personnel files of the archdiocese over the past 50 years for any new credible accusations of sexual abuse by priests against minors.

Coadjutor Archbishop and Archbishop of Seattle

On April 29, 2019, Pope Francis named Etienne as coadjutor archbishop of the Archdiocese of Seattle. The appointment was publicized by Archbishop Christophe Pierre, apostolic nuncio to the United States. The Mass celebrating his "rite of reception" was held on June 7, 2019, at St. James Cathedral.

On September 3, 2019, Pierre informed the archdiocese that Etienne had automatically become Archbishop of Seattle, following the resignation of his predecessor, Archbishop J. Peter Sartain. On September 9, 2019, Etienne announced that he would not reside in Connolly House, the mansion for the archbishop of Seattle.  He stated:

On June 21, 2021, Etienne announced his opposition to a proposal on the eucharist by the United States Conference of Catholic Bishops, stating that it had become politicized.

See also

 Catholic Church hierarchy
 Catholic Church in the United States
 Historical list of the Catholic bishops of the United States
 List of Catholic bishops of the United States
 Lists of patriarchs, archbishops, and bishops

References

External links
 
 
 

1959 births
Living people
Bellarmine University alumni
University of St. Thomas (Minnesota) alumni
Roman Catholic Archdiocese of Indianapolis
Roman Catholic bishops of Cheyenne
Roman Catholic archbishops of Seattle
21st-century Roman Catholic archbishops in the United States
People from Tell City, Indiana
Religious leaders from Indiana
Catholics from Indiana